Fantastic Beasts: The Crimes of Grindelwald is the film score to the 2018 film of the same name, composed by James Newton Howard. The soundtrack was released in both digital and physical formats on 9 and 30 November 2018 respectively by WaterTower Music, with a vinyl being released later on 25 January 2019.

Background
James Newton Howard, who previously scored the previous film confirmed in a podcast that he would be returning to score the sequel. Howard said in an interview that he saw a "wonderful musical opportunity" with Fantastic Beasts: The Crimes of Grindelwald due to depth of the film. He further stated that he had a passionate and enthusiastic collaboration with director David Yates who he said focused a lot on the musical aspect of the film.

Howard recorded over 2 hours of music, stating that over 90% of the score was new material and not based on the themes of the previous film. In addition, he wanted the "audience to feel, because it’s an emotional piece” highlighting the mix of the adventurous, dark, comedic and enchanting moments in the film. The score was recorded at Abbey Road Studios in London with a 90-piece of the London Symphony Orchestra, conducted by Pete Anthony, together with 40 members from the London Voices choir and the Trinity Boy's choir with orchestrations provided by Howard, Anthony, Jeff Atmajian, Peter Boyer, Jim Honeyman, Philip Klein, Jon Kull and John Ashton Thomas.

Track listing
The last 3 tracks which appear on the album are piano solos of the individual themes, that Howard performed himself and will not appear in the film. These tracks were released on 26 October 2018. Also not on the soundtrack is Hedwig's Theme composed by John Williams which plays when it transitions to Hogwarts.

Personnel

 James Newton Howard — composer, orchestrator, liner notes, soundtrack producer
 Pete Anthony — conductor, orchestrator
 Jeff Atmajian — orchestrator
 Jon Kull — orchestrator
 Philip Klein — orchestrator
 John Ashton Thomas — orchestrator
 Peter Boyer — orchestrator
 Shawn Murphy — recording engineer
 Peter Cobbin — score mixer
 Kirsty Whalley — score mixer
 John Barrett — protools operator

 Xander Rodzinski — soundtrack producer, technical scoring engineer
 Tyler Durham — technical scoring engineer
 Chris Cozen — technical scoring engineer
 Cecile Tournesac — score editor
 Pamela Sollie — score coordinator
 Thomas Bowes — orchestra leader
 London Voices — choir, chorus
 Trinity Boy's Choir — choir, chorus
 Mark Graham — music preparation
 John Williams – original composer of Hedwig's Theme
 David Yates – executive producer, liner notes

Charts

References

2018 soundtrack albums
Fantastic Beasts
Fantasy film soundtracks
London Symphony Orchestra soundtracks
WaterTower Music soundtracks
Wizarding World music